Anders Aplin is a Singaporean professional footballer who plays as a centre-back or right-back for Singapore Premier League club Hougang United and the Singapore national team.

Club career

Youth career
Anders was part of the Singapore Sports School's inaugural cohort of footballers and moved on to the National Football Academy under-18s. In 2009, he was part of the Victoria Junior College football team which won the National Schools A Division title.

Singapore Cricket Club 
Although Anders was part of the Singapore Sports School's inaugural cohort of footballers, playing alongside future Lions such as Safuwan Baharudin and Madhu Mohana, his decision to focus on his studies saw him fall through the cracks of Singapore's professional football circuit. As a result, Anders played for Singapore Cricket Club in the amateur National Football League.

Singapore Recreation Club 
Anders next played for Singapore Recreation Club , where he was spotted by Geylang coach Noor Ali, who was then helming Yishun Sentek Mariners. He was invited for trials with Geylang at the end of 2015 who was drawn to Anders' aggression and determination.

Geylang International
Anders started his professional football career with Geylang International in 2016 and made his debut in a League Cup game against Balestier Khalsa. He signed his first professional contract a year later. His performances in the 2017 S.League season saw him win his first call up to Singapore national team. He was also picked for a trial with J2 League side Matsumoto Yamaga FC in early 2018.

Matsumoto Yamaga
On 7 August 2018, it was announced on the club's website that Anders had signed a loan deal with Matsumoto Yamaga until the end of the season. This loan made Anders the first Singaporean to play in the J2 League and in Japan.

International career
Anders was first called up by coach V. Sundramoorthy in 2017 although he did not travel with the team for the friendly against Qatar and the Asian Cup qualifier against Turkmenistan on 10 October. He made his debut on 23 March 2018 in a 3-2 win against Maldives, replacing Irfan Fandi in the 73rd minute.

Personal life
He is the cousin of former Singapore international footballer Tan Kim Leng. Aplin is also a graduate of Nanyang Technological University (NTU), with a degree in business. He was also a commando in the Singapore Armed Forces (SAF) during his National Service.

From December 2019 to March 2021, Aplin was married to Rachel Wong, having first met while studying at NTU. The marriage was later annulled by Aplin on accounts of Wong's infidelity.

Career statistics

Club 
As of match played 27 February 2022

International 

As of match played 27 March 2018
Appearances and goals by national team and year

References

External links

Living people
1991 births
Singaporean footballers
Singapore international footballers
Singaporean expatriate footballers
Singapore Sports School alumni
Victoria Junior College alumni
Association football defenders
Geylang International FC players
Hougang United FC players